Sir (Frank) Cyril Hawker (21 July 1900 – 22 February 1991) was an English banker and cricketer.

Hawker was born in Epping in 1900, the son of Frank Charles Hawker. He was educated at the City of London School between 1913 and 1919.

Finance
Hawker joined the Bank of England in 1920. Appointed Chief Accountant in 1948, he was given the major task of administering the Bank's major responsibilities in connection with the Government's nationalisation programme. After a period as Adviser to the Governors, he was appointed Executive Director and Member of the Court in 1954. He played a large role in the establishment of the central banks of the newly independent Commonwealth countries.

Hawker left the Bank in 1962 to become Chairman of The Standard Bank Ltd. He was also Chairman of The Bank of West Africa (1965-1973), Union Zairoise de Banques (1969-1974), The Chartered Bank (1973-1974). After orchestrating its merger in 1969, he then became first chairman of the Standard Chartered Banking Group until 1974.

Amongst his many other roles, he was Deputy Chairman, Midland and International Banks between 1962 and 1974.

Cricket & Football

He was a right-handed batsman who played first-class cricket for Essex.  Captain of the City of London School XI from 1917 to 1919, he became a talented club cricketer, playing mostly for Southgate, but also turning out for such clubs as I Zingari, the Free Foresters and the Frogs. In 1937 he appeared in his only first-class match, for Essex against a powerful Lancashire side at Old Trafford, and batting at No. 8 he made 16 and 10. Like everything else in the match, his efforts were dwarfed by Eddie Paynter's magnificent 266.

He was heavily involved in the running and administration of the game as well, becoming President of Marylebone Cricket Club (MCC) in 1970–1971. He presided over the creation of the Limited Overs International format, which first took place in Melbourne in 1971 during his presidency.

Hawker was a sporting all rounder and was also chairman of the Amateur Football Association (AFA) in 1971. He was Vice-President of the National Playing Fields Association from 1976 until his death, and Hon. Vice-President of the Football Association in 1970.

Personal life
Hawker married Marjorie Ann Pearce (sister of TN Pearce, cricketer and President of Essex County Cricket Club) in 1931, and had three daughters. He was created a Knight Bachelor in the 1958 New Years Honours List. He was a Member of the Court of the Worshipful Company of Mercers. He was also High Sheriff of the County of London, 1963–1964. He was a member of the Athenaeum Club, London.

External links
Cyril Hawker at Cricket Archive
http://www.espncricinfo.com/england/content/player/14099.html

References

1900 births
1991 deaths
English cricketers
Essex cricketers
People educated at the City of London School
High Sheriffs of the County of London
Knights Bachelor
People associated with the Bank of England
People from Epping
Presidents of the Marylebone Cricket Club
Standard Chartered people
20th-century English businesspeople